Abdullah II of Jordan (born 1962) is the current King of Jordan.

Abdullah or Abdallah II may also refer to:
 Abdallah II of Ifriqiya (died 903), Emir of the Aghlabids (902–903) in present-day Tunisia
 Abdullah II of the Maldives, sultan in 1377
 Abdullah II of Kanem, ruler of Kanem-Boru (1424–1432) in present-day Chad
 Abdullah Khan II (1533/4–1598), Shaybanid ruler of Bukhara (1583–1598)
 Abdallah II of Morocco, one of several rulers:
 Abdallah II (Saadi dynasty), Saadi ruler of Fes (1613–1623)
 Abdallah of Morocco a.k.a. Moulay Abdallah bin Ismail (1694–1757), Sultan of Morocco six times between 1729 and 1757
 Abdullah II bin Hashim, Sharif of Mecca in 1696
 Abdallah II. ibn Thunayyan (d. 1843), imam of the Saudi Emirate of Nejd (1841–1843)
 Abdullah II Al-Sabah (1814–1892), Shaikh of Kuwait (1866–1892)
 Ignatius Abded Aloho II a.k.a. Ignatius Abdullah II (1833–1915), Syriac Orthodox Patriarch of Antioch (1906–1915)
 Abdullah Muhammad Shah II of Perak (1842–1922), Sultan of Perak (1874–1877) in British-administered Federated Malay States
 'Abd Allah II ibn 'Ali 'Abd ash-Shakur (died 1930), last Emir of Harar (1884–1887) in present-day Ethiopia

See also 
 Abdullah (disambiguation)
 Abdullah I (disambiguation)
 Abdullah Khan (disambiguation)
 King Abdullah (disambiguation)